Caroline Abbot Stanley (born August 16, 1849) was an American author.  Her best known book was the Civil War novel Order No. 11 (1904), which was a regional best seller.

Biography
Carolina Abbot was born in Callaway County, Missouri in 1849.  She married Elisha Stanley in 1871 at Pleasant Hill, Missouri.  Her husband died in 1875, and she then taught school in Kalamazoo, Michigan.  After 1896 she became a full-time writer.

In 1904, she published Order No. 11, a historical novel which takes its name from General Order No. 11 (1863), a Union Army directive issued during the American Civil War on August 25, 1863, forcing the evacuation of rural areas in four counties in western Missouri.  Order No. 11 appeared on regional-best seller lists in The Bookman in 1904.

Her follow-up novel A Modern Madonna (1906) was adapted to silent film in 1922's The Forgotten Law.

References

External links
 
 
 
 Order no. 11: a tale of the border (The Century Co. 1904), full copy via Google books

1849 births
Novelists from Missouri
People from Callaway County, Missouri
American women novelists
20th-century American novelists
19th-century American writers
19th-century American women writers
20th-century American women writers
Year of death missing